NGC 6741, also known as the Phantom Streak Nebula, is located about 7000 light-years away in the constellation of Aquila (the Eagle). NGC 6741 is classed as a planetary nebula, though no planets are responsible for this billowy cloud; the term came about in the 18th century because the round gas shells resembled the Solar System's outer giant planets in astronomers' telescopes. Although fairly bright, this object appears very small through a typical telescope and was missed by early surveyors of the skies and only spotted in 1882 by Edward Charles Pickering.

References

External links
 
 A Star Makes a Billowy Exit — ESA/Hubble picture of the week.
 SEDS: NGC 6741
 NGC 6741 (Phantom Streak Nebula) at Constellation Guide

Planetary nebulae
Aquila (constellation)
6741